Gull Lake is the name of several lakes in Ontario, Canada.

Gull Lake, Muskoka. The town of Gravenhurst is located on its shores.

Gull Lake, Haliburton County, south of Minden, on the Gull River. The community of Miners Bay is located at its southern extremity. It was designated for Lake Trout Management by the Ministry of Natural Resources in 2006.

Gull Lake, Timiskaming District. It is the source for drinking water for the community of Kirkland Lake, and it is most popular for bass fishing.

There are other Gull Lakes in Ontario, including one near Markstay-Warren, and one near Dryden.

See also
List of lakes in Ontario

References

External links
 Natural Resources Canada

Lakes of Timiskaming District